Curling at the 2019 Canada Winter Games took place at the Pidherney Curling Centre in Red Deer, Alberta. The event ran from Sunday, February 24, 2019 to Saturday, March 2, 2019.

Medalists

Men

Teams

Round-robin standings
Final round-robin standings

Round-robin results

Draw 1
Sunday, February 24, 10:00

Draw 2
Sunday, February 24, 17:00

Draw 3
Monday, February 25, 10:00

Draw 4
Monday, February 25, 17:00

Draw 5
Tuesday, February 26, 09:00

Draw 6
Tuesday, February 26, 14:00

Draw 7
Tuesday, February 26, 19:00

Draw 8
Wednesday, February 27, 10:00

Draw 9
Wednesday, February 27, 17:00

Draw 10
Thursday, February 28, 10:00

Draw 11
Thursday, February 28, 17:00

Draw 12
Friday, March 1, 09:00

Playoffs

Quarterfinals
Friday, March 1, 14:00

Semifinals
Friday, March 1, 19:00

Bronze Medal Game
Saturday, March 2, 10:00

Gold Medal Game
Saturday, March 2, 10:00

Final standings

Women

Teams

Round-robin standings
Final round-robin standings

Round-robin results

Draw 1
Sunday, February 24, 10:00

Draw 2
Sunday, February 24, 17:00

Draw 3
Monday, February 25, 10:00

Draw 4
Monday, February 25, 17:00

Draw 5
Tuesday, February 26, 09:00

Draw 6
Tuesday, February 26, 14:00

Draw 7
Tuesday, February 26, 19:00

Draw 8
Wednesday, February 27, 10:00

Draw 9
Wednesday, February 27, 17:00

Draw 10
Thursday, February 28, 10:00

Draw 11
Thursday, February 28, 17:00

Draw 12
Friday, March 1, 09:00

Playoffs

Quarterfinals
Friday, March 1, 14:00

Semifinals
Friday, March 1, 19:00

Bronze Medal Game
Saturday, March 2, 10:00

Gold Medal Game
Saturday, March 2, 10:00

Final standings

References

External links
 https://cg2019.gems.pro/Default.aspx?SetLanguage=en-CA

2019 in Canadian curling
Curling in Alberta
2019 Canada Winter Games